Midnight Sun is the second studio album by Aimer, released in 2014 under the Defstar Records label. It was released in two versions: a limited CD+DVD edition and a regular CD-only edition. The album reached number nine in its first week on the Oricon Albums Chart; it charted for a total of 16 weeks and sold more than 19,000 copies.

Track listing

Charts

References

External links
  (Aimer-web)
 
 
 Midnight Sun on VGMdb

Aimer albums
Japanese-language albums
2014 albums
Defstar Records albums